Geminaria canalis is a species of bee flies in the family Bombyliidae that occurs in southwestern North America.

References

Bombyliidae
Articles created by Qbugbot
Insects described in 1887